The Ruminant Band is the fourth album by American folk-rock band Fruit Bats, released on August 4, 2009.

"Primitive Man" was chosen as the Starbucks iTunes Pick of the Week for December 22, 2009.

Track listing
"Primitive Man"
"The Ruminant Band"
"Tegucigalpa"
"Beautiful Morning Light"
"The Hobo Girl"
"Being on Our Own"
"My Unusual Friend"
"Singing Joy to the World"
"The Blessed Breeze"
"Feather Bed"
"Flamingo"

References

Fruit Bats (band) albums
2009 albums
Sub Pop albums